Sheray Thomas (born October 4, 1984) is a male Canadian basketball player who plays as a forward, currently for the Montreal Jazz of the National Basketball League of Canada. He ended up in seventh place with the Canada national men's basketball team at the 2007 Pan American Games in Rio de Janeiro, Brazil.

Sheray Thomas son of Darcelle Thomas and Robert Fields, was born in Montreal, Quebec. He has one sister named Chelsea Fields

References

Canadian Olympic Committee

1984 births
Living people
Anglophone Quebec people
Basketball players at the 2007 Pan American Games
Canadian men's basketball players
Montreal Jazz players
Pan American Games competitors for Canada
Basketball players from Montreal
University of Kentucky alumni
Forwards (basketball)